The city of Leuven, in the former Duchy of Brabant, has been the seat of four universities:

1425: The University of Leuven (1425–1797) or Studium Generale Lovaniense or Universitas Studiorum Lovaniensis, was founded by the French prince Jean de Valois Bourgogne, Duke John IV of Brabant, with the consent of Pope Martin V. This university was officially abolished in 1797.
1817: The State University of Leuven was founded. This university was officially abolished in 1835.
1835: The new Catholic University of Mechlin was established in Leuven and took the name of Catholic University of Leuven. The University Faculty which was originally composed almost entirely of clergy was under the direct leadership of the bishops of Belgium. This university was divided into two parts French and Dutch.
1919: The Evangelical Theological Faculty was founded. It is a private university offering bachelor's and master's degrees in theology.

See also
Old University of Leuven
Collegium Trilingue
Faculty of Theology, Old University of Leuven
State University of Leuven
Catholic University of Leuven
Université catholique de Louvain
Louvain-la-Neuve
Katholieke Universiteit Leuven
Academic libraries in Leuven
Faculty of Theology, Catholic University of Leuven
List of colleges of Leuven University

Notes

Education in Leuven
Universities in Belgium